Stephen Oyoung is an American actor best known for television and video games. His most prominent role was portraying the villain Martin Li / Mister Negative in the 2018 video game Spider-Man. It was announced shortly after DC FanDome that Stephen would be voicing the role of Jason Todd / Red Hood in WB Montreal's 2022 video game Gotham Knights.

Biography
Oyoung became interested in acting at the age of seven and began appearing in school plays. His father taught him Wushu, becoming adept in it. As he grew up he began to feel that acting was his calling, but did not know how it would happen, "I wanted to be the next Bruce Lee, but I never believed I would seriously pursue acting. I didn't know where to start". Oyoung tried to be a computer programmer and tried entering politics, the latter of which he enjoyed but had this to say about it: "I'd much rather play a politician on TV." His parents were fully supportive of his endeavor with him admitting that his mom would watch anything he was in. He initially began working at places such as Pirates Dinner Adventure and Disneyland to make a living before booking roles in film and television.

He worked in films such as Terminator Dark Fate, Olympus Has Fallen and Sicario. He trained actors Keanu Reeves, Denzel Washington and Adam Driver for the films 47 Ronin, The Equalizer and Star Wars: The Force Awakens, respectively. He appeared on television in major shows such as HBO’s Insecure, NCIS, Apple TV’s For All Mankind, CSI: Las Vegas, and Netflix’  Jupiter’s Legacy . In video games he portrayed a Jedi Master in Star Wars: The Old Republic and gained more recognition as Martin Li / Mister Negative in the 2018 video game Spider-Man. 

Oyoung guest-starred in The Book of Boba Fett where he did the physical performance of Dokk Strassi who was voiced by Robert Rodriguez.

Filmography

References

External links

Living people
 American male actors of Chinese descent
 American male film actors
 American male television actors
 American male video game actors
 American male voice actors
21st-century American male actors
 Year of birth missing (living people)